The S. Rajaratnam School of International Studies (RSIS) is an autonomous graduate school in Singapore, and policy-oriented think tank within the Nanyang Technological University (NTU). Founded in 1996 as the Institute of Defence and Strategic Studies, RSIS offers graduate education in international affairs, taught by an array of international faculty. The school is named after former Deputy Prime Minister S. Rajaratnam.

RSIS' research, teaching and networking objectives are aimed at assisting policymakers to develop comprehensive approaches to strategic thinking in areas related to Singapore's interests.

Overview
The RSIS started off as the Institute of Defence and Strategic Studies (IDSS), autonomous research institute within the Nanyang Technological University.

Its stated objectives are to conduct research and provide general and graduate education in the area of national security, military technology and international relations. It also promotes joint and exchange programmes with similar regional and international institutions; and organises seminars and conferences on these topics.

When RSIS was established on 1 January 2007, IDSS remained a security-research focused institute within the school, and teaching functions were taken over by the school.

Constituents of the school include
 Institute of Defence and Strategic Studies (IDSS),
 International Centre for Political Violence and Terrorism Research (ICPVTR),
 Centre of Excellence for National Security (CENS),
 Centre for Non-Traditional Security Studies (NTS Centre),
 Centre for Multilateralism Studies (CMS).

The school's Master of Science degree programmes in Strategic Studies, International Relations, Asian Studies, and International Political Economy are distinguished by their focus on the Asia Pacific, the professional practice of international affairs, and the cultivation of academic depth. In 2010, a Double Masters Programme with Warwick University was also launched, with students required to spend the first year at Warwick and the second year at RSIS. A select Doctor of Philosophy programme caters to advanced students who are supervised by senior faculty members with matching interests.

Research

Research at RSIS covers a wide spectrum of security and strategic issues, organised into four interlinking areas:

Asia-Pacific Security
Conflict and Non-traditional Security
International Political Economy
Country and Area Studies

RSIS shares its research findings with the strategic studies and defence policy communities through workshops, conferences, articles in refereed journals and frequent analyses of contemporary events through the RSIS Commentary series.

The School has also established the S. Rajaratnam Professorship in Strategic Studies (named after Singapore's first Foreign Minister), to bring distinguished scholars to participate in the work of the institute. Previous holders of the chairmanship include Professors Stephen Walt (Harvard University), Jack Snyder (Columbia University), Wang Jisi (Chinese Academy of Social Sciences), Alastair Iain Johnston (Harvard University) and John Mearsheimer (University of Chicago). A Visiting Research Fellow Programme also enables overseas scholars to carry out related research in the School.

Notable faculty members
Current notable faculty members include Dr Rohan Gunaratna, Associate Professor Tan See Seng, and Professor Joseph Liow

Teaching

RSIS Master of Science programme offers advanced education to professionals from both the private and public sectors in Singapore and overseas in four specializations: the Master of Science in Strategic Studies, the Master of Science in International Relations, the Master of Science in International Political Economy and the Master of Science in Asian Studies.  The school also offers double-degree programmes in collaboration with the University of Warwick and the Nanyang Business School at NTU.

The RSIS Doctoral programme was established in 2006 and awards the degree of Doctor of Philosophy for research in the areas of study of the institute.

In addition to these graduate programmes, the School also teaches modules in courses conducted by the SAFTI Military Institute, SAFWOS Leadership School, Civil Defence Academy, and the Defence and Home Affairs Ministries.

Networking

RSIS convenes workshops, seminars and colloquia on aspects of international relations and security development that are of contemporary and historical significance. The school's activities include public lectures, Colloquium on Strategic Trends in the 21st Century, the annual Asia Pacific Programme for Senior Military Officers (APPSMO), the Asia Pacific Programme for Senior National Security Officers (APPSNO), the biennial Asia Pacific Security Conference and the Singapore Global Dialogue.

RSIS staff participate in Track II security dialogues and scholarly conferences in the Asia-Pacific.  The School has participated in research projects funded by the Ford Foundation, the John D. and Catherine T. MacArthur Foundation and the Sasakawa Peace Foundation. It also serves as the Secretariat for the Council for Security Cooperation in the Asia-Pacific (CSCAP), Singapore.

Notable alumni
Notable alumni of the school include Agus Yudhoyono and Edhie Baskoro Yudhoyono, sons of former Indonesian President Susilo Bambang Yudhoyono; Loro Horta, son of former Timor Leste President José Ramos-Horta; Hekmat Karzai, cousin of former Afghan President Hamid Karzai; and Tito Karnavian, Indonesian Minister of Home Affairs.

References

External links

Political and economic think tanks based in Singapore
Counterterrorism in Singapore
Foreign policy and strategy think tanks
Educational institutions established in 2007
Nanyang Technological University
2007 establishments in Singapore